Cuffaro is a surname native to Southern Italy. Notable people with the surname include:

 Maria Cuffaro, Italian journalist
 Salvatore Cuffaro, Italian ex-politician, convicted for aiding the Sicilian Mafia, currently serving his time.
 Cristian Cuffaro Russo, Argentine footballer
 Antonino Cuffaro, Italian political, President of the Party of Italian Communists, former senator of the Italian Republic
 Silvestre Cuffaro, Italian sculpture and political

Italian-language surnames